St. Joan of Arc School may refer to:

Elementary/Primary schools 
 St. Joan of Arc School, Canton, OH
 St. Joan of Arc School, Evesham Township, New Jersey
 St. Joan of Arc School, Jackson Heights, Queens, NY

High/Secondary schools 
 St Joan of Arc Catholic School, Rickmansworth, Herts., UK
 St. Joan of Arc High School, Barrie, Ontario, Canada     see Simcoe Muskoka Catholic District School Board
 St. Joan of Arc Catholic Secondary School, Mississauga, Ontario, Canada
 St. Joan of Arc Catholic High School, Maple, Ontario, Canada
 St. Joan of Arc Secondary School, Hong Kong